Monoceromyia is a genus of hoverfly. Species in the genus are found in the Afrotropical, Australasian, Neotropical and Oriental regions. They are mimics of wasps and the genus is distinguished by the metapleura being widely separate behind the hind coxae. The elongated frontal base of the antenna is at least as long as the basal segment of the antenna and the second abdominal tergum is longer than wide and constricted.

Systematics
Species include:

  Monoceromyia afra (Wiedemann 1830) 
  Monoceromyia ammophilina (Speiser, 1910) 
  Monoceromyia annulata (Kertész, 1913) 
  Monoceromyia atacta (Riek, 1954)  
  Monoceromyia bicolor (Kertesz 1902) 
Monoceromyia brunnecorporalis Yang & Cheng, 1999
Monoceromyia bubulici
  Monoceromyia cacica (Walker 1860) 
  Monoceromyia caffra (Loew, 1853) 
  Monoceromyia chusanensis (Ôuchi, 1943) 
  Monoceromyia congolensis (Bezzi, 1908) 
  Monoceromyia crocata (Cheng, 2012) 
  Monoceromyia crux (Brunetti, 1915) 
  Monoceromyia daphnaeus (Walker 1849) 
  Monoceromyia doddi (Ferguson 1926) 
  Monoceromyia euchroma (Riek, 1954)  
Monoceromyia eumenioides 
  Monoceromyia fabricii (Thompson, 1981) 
Monoceromyia fenestrata 
  Monoceromyia flavipennis (Meijere, 1908) 
Monoceromyia flavoscutata 
Monoceromyia floridensis Shannon, 1922
  Monoceromyia frenata (Loew 1853) 
  Monoceromyia gambiana (Saunders, 1845) 
  Monoceromyia globigaster (Hull, 1944)  
Monoceromyia gloriosa
Monoceromyia guangxiana Yang & Cheng, 1999
Monoceromyia hervebazini
  Monoceromyia himalayensis (Meijere, 1908) 
  Monoceromyia hopei (Saunders, 1845) 
Monoceromyia javana 
  Monoceromyia katoniana (Bezzi, 1921) 
  Monoceromyia lateralis (Walker, 1859) 
  Monoceromyia lynchii (Williston, 1888) 
  Monoceromyia macleayi (Ferguson, 1926)  
Monoceromyia macrosticta
  Monoceromyia maculipennis (Hervé-Bazin, 1913) 
Monoceromyia madecassa
  Monoceromyia mastersi (Ferguson, 1926)   
  Monoceromyia melanosoma (Cheng, 2012) 
  Monoceromyia metallica  (Wulp, 1898) 
  Monoceromyia multipunctata (Hull, 1941) 
  Monoceromyia neavei (Bezzi, 1915) 
Monoceromyia nigra 
Monoceromyia obscura 
Monoceromyia patricia 
  Monoceromyia petersi (Speiser, 1924) 
Monoceromyia pleuralis Coquillett, 1898
Monoceromyia polistoides 
  Monoceromyia pulchra (Hervé-Bazin, 1913) 
  Monoceromyia relicta (Walker, 1858) 
  Monoceromyia rufifrons (Curran, 1927) 
  Monoceromyia rufipetiolata (Huo & Ren, 2006) 
Monoceromyia salvazai
  Monoceromyia similis (Kertész, 1913) 
  Monoceromyia speiseri (Hervé-Bazin, 1913) 
Monoceromyia stackelbergi
Monoceromyia stenogaster
  Monoceromyia subarmata (Curran 1926) 
  Monoceromyia superba 
  Monoceromyia swierstrai (Doesburg, 1955) 
  Monoceromyia tienmushanensis (Ôuchi, 1943) 
  Monoceromyia tolmera (Riek, 1954)  Monoceromyia tredecimpunctata 
  Monoceromyia tricolor (Loew, 1861)  Monoceromyia trinotata 
  Monoceromyia ugandana (Kertész, 1913) 
  Monoceromyia unipunctata (Doesburg, 1956) 
  Monoceromyia varipes (Curran, 1927) 
  Monoceromyia verralli (Williston, 1892) 
  Monoceromyia vittipes (Curran, 1941)  Monoceromyia wallacei Shannon, 1927
  Monoceromyia weemsi (Thompson, 1981) Monoceromyia wiedemanni Shannon, 1927Monoceromyia wui  Monoceromyia yentaushanensis ''(Ôuchi, 1943)

References

Hoverfly genera
Eristalinae